Murihiti is one of 43 islands in the Manihiki atoll of the Cook Islands. It is a small island, in the gap in the atoll between Tauhunu and Ngake.

References

Manihiki